Vesko Pajović (17 June 1953 – 27 January 2016) was a Serbian professional basketball player.

Basketball career 
Pajović started his basketball career playing with a team from his hometown Kosovska Mitrovica. 

In 1972, Pajović moved to Belgrade where he started to play for Crvena zvezda of the Yugoslav Federal League. During three seasons with the Zvezda, he played 84 games and averaged 0.9 points per game. Also he won two Yugoslav Cups. Together with Zoran Slavnić, Dragan Kapičić and Ljubodrag Simonović he was a member of the Crvena zvezda team that won the 1973–74 FIBA European Cup Winners' Cup. He did not play any game during the competition.

Career achievements 
 FIBA European Cup Winners' Cup winner: 1 (with Crvena zvezda: 1973–74).
 Yugoslav Cup winner: 2 (with Crvena zvezda: 1972–73, 1974–75).

References

1953 births
2016 deaths
KK Crvena zvezda players
Serbian men's basketball players
Sportspeople from Mitrovica, Kosovo
Yugoslav men's basketball players